The following are the winners of the 28th annual (2001) Origins Award, presented at Origins 2002:

External links
 2001 Origins Awards Winners

2001 awards
2001 awards in the United States
Origins Award winners